A swimming dress, also known as a swim dress, is a modern dress worn by women while swimming that preserves traditional religious definitions of modesty. Swimming dresses are popular among Christians belonging to the conservative holiness movement, Orthodox Jews and many Muslims; many wearers of swimming dresses, such as the Methodists of the conservative holiness movement, believe that modern popular practice of the wearing of trousers by women blurs the distinction between men and women, while others, such as adherent Muslims teach that pants should not be worn by women as they reveal the contour of the legs that should be hidden to maintain modesty. Swimming dresses have sleeves that usually go beyond the elbows as well as hemlines that extend beyond the knees for the purpose of maintaining traditional religious definitions of modesty (cf. outward holiness). In Israel, they are known as Shvimkleid. In recent years, the demand for modest clothing has risen, which may be due to the growth of religious traditions such as Apostolic Pentecostalism. This has led to a greater interest in swimming dresses.

See also 
Burqini
Christian headcovering
Full-length denim skirt
Modest fashion
Quiverfull

References

Further reading 

Swimsuits
Dresses
Methodism
Hasidic clothing